The La Garita Mountains are a high mountain range in the San Juan Mountains, a sub-range of the Rocky Mountains. The mountains are located in Saguache and Mineral counties in southwestern Colorado and are  almost entirely managed as public land within the Gunnison National Forest and the Rio Grande National Forest.

The La Garita Mountains lie within the La Garita Wilderness, one of Colorado's lesser known, but more picturesque, wilderness areas. "La Garita means "the lookout" in Spanish, and this wilderness amply deserves the name. From the summit of this wilderness's single fourteener (14,014 foot San Luis Peak), climbers can gaze across the upper Rio Grande Valley and down the long stretch of the San Luis Valley. About 35 miles of the Continental Divide lie well above a sprawling forestland that provides ideal habitats for huge numbers of elk and mule deer.

Geology
During the Oligocene epoch, a series of caldera building eruptions of titanic proportions, some as large as VEI-8, devastated what is now Colorado and raised up the mountain chain, part of the San Juan Mountains. The La Garita supervolcano's mega-colossal eruption created 5000 km3 of tephra, the largest eruption known. The volcanic area has been extinct for tens for millions of years and is of no danger to anyone.

Mountains
According to the U.S. Geological Survey, the following peaks are part of the La Garita Mountains:

See also

La Garita Caldera

References

Mountain ranges of Colorado
Ranges of the Rocky Mountains
San Juan Mountains (Colorado)
Landforms of Saguache County, Colorado
Landforms of Mineral County, Colorado
Rio Grande National Forest